Viola braguesa is a stringed instrument from Braga, north-western Portugal. It has 10 strings in 5 courses. The strings are made of steel. It is tuned C4/C3–G4/G3–A4/A3–D4/D4–G4/G4.

Requinta

Many , such as the Viola braguesa, have smaller requinto versions also, called 'requinta'. The viola braguesa requinta is tuned: A4/A3–C5/C4–F5/F4–C5/C5–E5/E5. This tuning is a fifth above the standard Viola braguesa.

See also
 Viola caipira
 Cavaquinho
 Bandolim
 Guitarra portuguesa

References

External links
 The Stringed Instrument Database
 ATLAS of Plucked Instruments

String instruments
Portuguese musical instruments